Panathinaikos V.C., also known simply as Panathinaikos, or with its full name Panathinaikos A.O. (transliterated "Panathinaikos Athlitikos Omilos", Panathenaic Athletic Club) is the professional volleyball team of the major Athens based multi-sport club Panathinaikos A.O. Founded in 1919, it is one of the oldest and most successful volleyball clubs in Greece. They have won 20 Greek Championships finishing 6 times undefeated (1962–63, 1965–66, 1966–67, 1969–70, 1970–71, 1974–75), 6 Greek Cups, 2 Greek League Cups and 2 Greek Super Cups. They have reached also twice the CEV Cup final (1979–80, 2008–09).

Notable Greek player have played for the team, while foreign world-class players that have played with the club include Dante Amaral, Marcelo Elgarten, André Nascimento, Frank Depestele, Liberman Agamez, Peter Pláteník, Jakub Novotný, Plamen Konstantinov, Boyan Yordanov, Björn Andrae, Andrija Gerić, Clayton Stanley, Ernardo Gómez, Renaud Herpe, Guillaume Samica, Dawid Murek, Paweł Zagumny and Łukasz Żygadło.

History

The volleyball department of Panathinaikos was founded in 1919 and is one of the first in Greece. With the participation of Giorgos Kalafatis in the Inter-Allied Games of Paris in 1919, and the informations he collected, the sport became more known in Greece. The same year the officials of the club decided the creation of a volleyball team.

The first dynamic presence of the team is dated back in the years 1927–29 with many popular players of the time such as the founder Giorgos Kalafatis, the historical member of the board Apostolos Nikolaidis, as well as players such as Athanasios Aravositas, Goumas, Arg. Nikolaidis, Papageorgiou and Papastefanou. In the following years the interest for volleyball became less until before World War II when Panathinaikos presented a powerful team with leader players such as Lambrou, Vallidis, Momferatos, Tzoumanis, Proselentis, Lykouris, Kakridis and more.

During the 60’s and 70’s, Panathinaikos' volleyball club won many titles and honors due to the fact that the team roster has always included some of the leading volleyball players and coaches in Greece. The first and most popular generation of players of 60’s was Andreas and Nikos Bergeles, as well as Iliopoulos, Leloudas, Chasapis, Emmanouil, Perros and Fotiou who opened the road for the next generations. Notable coaches of this era was the leading figure of the department Gerasimos Theodoratos, the Yugoslavian Sava Grozdanović and later the ex-player of the team Andreas Bergeles.

The most important achievement of the team was the participation in the final of the European Cup in 1980 with Grozdanović as coach and players such as Georgantis, Agrapidakis, Iliopoulos, Papadopoulos, Malousaris, Gountakos, Astras, Kokkinaras and Koliopoulos. In the following years, Panathinaikos team continued to dominate the Greek championship with Janusz Badora as coach and players such as Kazazis, Tentzeris, Gontikas, Galakos, Dimitriadis, Margaronis, Karamaroudis and Andreopoulos.

Two of the most successful periods have been 1994-95 and 1995-96 seasons, when Panathinaikos won 2 consecutive championships with Stelios Prosalikas as head coach and Andreopoulos, Triantafillidis, Filippov, Spanos, Hatziantoniou, Ouzounov, A. Kovacev, S. Kovacev, Karamaroudis, Mavrakis, Konstantinidis, Zakynthinos, Koutouleas, Tonev as players.

In 2001 the department became professional under the presidency and financial support of Vlassis Stathokostopoulos and later Thanasis Giannakopoulos.

In 2004 the team won the Championship with the ex-player Stelios Kazazis as coach. With the Brazilian star-player Dante Amaral and Marcelo Elgarten, they made a strong team and finished again first in 2006, while they reached again the final of the European Cup in 2009.

Honours

Domestic
 Greek Championship: (20) 
 1963, 1965, 1966, 1967, 1970,  1971, 1972, 1973, 1975, 1977, 1982, 1984, 1985, 1986, 1995, 1996, 2004, 2006, 2020, 2022
 Greek Cup: (6)
 1982, 1984, 1985, 2007, 2008, 2010
 League Cup: (2)
 2020, 2022
 Greek Super Cup: (2)
 2006, 2022

European
  CEV Cup
 Runners-up (2): 1994, 2009

Current men's volleyball squad
Team roster – season 2022/2023

Technical and managerial staff

Retired numbers

Selected former players

Albania
  Albano Qualiu
  Alvi Shurdhi
Argentina
  José Luis González
Belgium
  Frank Depestele
  Bram Van Den Dries
Bosnia-Herzegovina
  Milorad Kovać
Brazil
  Dante Amaral
  Eduardo Arruda
  Hugo de Leon Bozo
  Marcelo Elgarten
  Windson Ferreira
   Roberto Minuzzi
  Carlos Alexandre Moreira
  Andre Nascimento
  Marcelo Mendes Sacchi
  Cleber De Oliveira
  Lucas Victor Rangel
   Vinicius Raguzzoni
Bulgaria
  Theodoros Baev
  Plamen Konstantinov
  Petar Ouzounov
  Dimo Tonev
  Aleksandar Simeonov
  Boyan Yordanov
  Ivan Kovlev
  Antonis Kovachev
Canada
  Keith Sanheim
  Michael Amoroso
Colombia
  Liberman Agamez
Croatia
  Danijel Galić
Cuba
  Osniel Melgarejo
  Fernando Hernández
Cyprus
  Thanasis Protopsaltis
Czech Republic
  Jakub Novotný
  Petr Pešl 
  Peter Pláteník
  Dalibor Polak
  Petr Zapletal
Denmark 
  Axel Jacobsen
Egypt
  Ionas Rezk
France
  Fabrice Bry
  Ludovic Castard
  Renaud Herpe
  Guillaume Samica
Germany
  Björn Andrae
Greece
  Roulis Agrapidakis
  Asimakis Alexiou
  Andreas Andreadis
  Charalampos Andreopoulos
  Dimitris Andreopoulos
  Andreas Bergeles
  Nikos Bergeles
  Theodoros Chatziantoniou
  Kostas Christofidelis
  Dimitris Gontikas
  Christos Dimitrakopoulos
  Stathis Donas
  Pavlos Karamaroudis
  Stelios Kazazis
  Michalis Koliopoulos
  Antonis Kovatsev
  Savvas Kovatsev
  Giannis Laios
  Giannis Lambrou
  Ilias Lappas
  Christos Papadopoulos
  Sotirios Pantaleon
  Panagiotis Pelekoudas
  Giorgos Petreas
  Spiros Protopsaltis
  Thanasis Psarras
  Alexandros Raptis
  Nikos Samaras
  Giorgos Spanos
  Georgios Stefanou
  Nikolaos Smaragdis
  Akis Sidiropoulos
  Gerasimos Theodoratos
  Michalis Triantafyllidis
  Giorgos Zakynthinos
Italy
  Gianluca Saraceni
  Jiří Kovář
Montenegro
  Vojin Ćaćić
Netherlands
  Jairo Hooi
Poland
  Tomasz Józefacki
  Michał Kamiński
  Dawid Murek
  Paweł Zagumny
  Łukasz Żygadło
Russia
  Sergey Orlenko
  Gennady Cheremisov
Serbia
  Andrija Gerić
  Saša Starović
  Miloš Stojković
  Željko Tanasković
Slovenia
  Sašo Štalekar
Spain
  Jordi Gens
Ukraine
  Yuri Filippov
United States
  Brian Cook
  Jared Moore
  Jeff Nygaard
  Clayton Stanley
  Nick Vogel
Venezuela
  Hernando Gomez

Selected former coaches

  Gerasimos Theodoratos
  Sava Grozdanović
  Andreas Bergeles
  Nikos Bergeles
  Aurel Constantinescu
  Janusz Badora
  Stelios Prosalikas
  Carlos Xavier Weber
  Francisco dos Santos
  Mauro Berruto
  Alekos Leonis
  Stelios Kazazis

International record

Historical performance in the league

Sponsorships

 Official Sport Clothing Manufacturer: Macron
 Great Shirt Sponsor: OPAP / Pame Stoixima
 Official Sponsors:  Viva Fresh, Batteries.gr, Hygeia Medical Center, Avance Car Rental, Biosteel, CIEL, Civitel, Myo Cel, Boukia kai syhorio, Bolossis, Art & Fantasy
 Official Broadcaster: PAO TV

Historical uniforms

Arenas

Presidents
 2001–08: Vlassis Stathokostopoulos
 2008–09: Thanasis Giannakopoulos
 2009–11: Thodoris Liakopoulos
 2011: Stratos Sopilis
 2011–13: Chronis Akritidis
 2013–16: Manolis Ladoukakis
 2016–18: Dimitris Kassaris
 2018–20: Alexandros Ellinas
 2020–  : Panagiotis Malakates

See also
 Panathinaikos women's volleyball

References

External links
 Official website 

Panathinaikos A.O.
Panathinaikos V.C.
Greek volleyball clubs
Volleyball clubs established in 1919
Sports clubs in Athens